Dmitrovsky Uyezd (Дмитровский уезд) was one of the subdivisions of the Moscow Governorate of the Russian Empire. It was situated in the northeastern part of the governorate. Its administrative centre was Dmitrov.

Demographics
At the time of the Russian Empire Census of 1897, Dmitrovsky Uyezd had a population of 119,686. Of these, 99.6% spoke Russian, 0.1% German and 0.1% Ukrainian as their native language.

References

 
Uezds of Moscow Governorate
Moscow Governorate